is a junction passenger railway station located in the city of Higashimurayama, Tokyo, Japan, operated by the private railway operator Seibu Railway.

Lines
A limited number of through services to the Seibu Shinjuku line during the morning rush hour. The station is also a terminus of the 2.8 kilometer Seibu Yamaguchi Line.

Station layout
The station has one island platform for the Seibu Tamako Line, part of which is cut away to form a bay platform for the Seibu Yamaguchi Line.

Platforms

History
It was renamed  on 1 April 1941, and renamed  on 1 November 1951. The station was relocated 400 meters north to its present location on 20 September 1961, and was renamed  on 25 March 1975. On 13 March 2021 it was renamed to its current station name.

Station numbering was introduced on all Seibu Railway lines during fiscal 2012, with this station becoming "ST07" for the Seibu Tamako Line and "SY01" for the Seibu Yamaguchi Line.

Passenger statistics
In fiscal 2019, the station was the 84th busiest on the Seibu network, with an average of 2,587 passengers daily. 

The passenger figures for previous years are as shown below.

See also
 List of railway stations in Japan

References

External links

 Seibu-Yūenchi Station information (Seibu Railway) 

Railway stations in Tokyo
Railway stations in Japan opened in 1936
Stations of Seibu Railway
Seibu Tamako Line
Seibu Yamaguchi Line
Higashimurayama, Tokyo